The following is a list of episodes detailing the long-running ITV drama series A Touch of Frost, starring David Jason, John Lyons and Bruce Alexander.

Series overview

Episodes

Series 1 (1992)

Series 2 (1994)

Series 3 (1995)

Series 4 (1996)

Series 5 (1997)

Series 6 (1999)

Series 7 (1999–2000)

Series 8 (2001)

Series 9 (2002)

Series 10 (2003)

Series 11 (2003–04)

Series 12 (2005)

Series 13 (2006)

Series 14 (2008)

Series 15 (2010)

References

Lists of British crime television series episodes
Lists of British drama television series episodes